Aiken Winter Colony Historic District I, is located in Aiken, South Carolina, It is noteworthy in that it is viewed as the district most closely identified with the history of the Aiken Winter Colony. The area features over 30 properties, many of which are large impressive mansions with stables. Most of the properties were constructed between 1882 and 1948. It is possible to enjoy the district via “from the street,” but note that many of the properties and mansions are either fenced, or otherwise protected by shrubs and stately trees.  Aiken Winter Colony Historic District I was listed in the National Register of Historic Places on November 27, 1984.

References

Historic districts in Aiken County, South Carolina
National Register of Historic Places in Aiken County, South Carolina
Historic districts on the National Register of Historic Places in South Carolina
Buildings and structures in Aiken, South Carolina